Matthew Wells (14 December 1886 – 27 June 1953) was a British professional boxer in the lightweight and welterweight divisions.  In 1911, he held the Lightweight Championship of Great Britain, and in 1914 he claimed the Welterweight Championship of Britain and the Welterweight Championship of the World.

Biography
He was born in Walworth, London on 4 December 1886 and died in London on 27 June 1953.

Amateur career 
During his amateur career, he held the Amateur Boxing Association British featherweight title, when boxing out of the Lynn ABC, from 1904 to 1907.

Competing in the Olympics 
He competed in the 1908 Summer Olympics in London.  In the lightweight event he was eliminated in the quarter-finals after losing to Frederick Grace who later won the gold medal.

Professional career

1911 British title

Wells turned pro in 1909. On 27 February 1911, at the National Sporting Club in London he defeated Freddie Welsh in a twenty-round bout to win the lightweight championship of Great Britain and take home the Lonsdale belt, becoming the first Jewish boxer to hold the honor.  The win simultaneously bestowed the EBU's (European Boxing Union) lightweight championship.

On 2 June 1911, he defeated the great Jewish New York boxer Leach Cross at the Harlem Casino in New York by newspaper decision. The Montreal Gazette noted that the "bout went the full ten rounds, Wells having all the better of it."  The New York Times agreed with the decision of the Gazette.  Wells delivered two hard blows in the ninth that proved his hitting power against a boxer who was noted for exceptional defensive skills.

Remarkably, only three weeks after defeating Leach Cross, Wells defeated highly rated boxer "Philadelphia" Pal Moore on 24 June 1911 in a twelve round points decision at the Armory in Boston.  Moore fought a host of champions in his career.

Wells defeated "Knockout" Brown before an enthusiastic crowd as large as 14,000 on 30 August 1911 in a ten round newspaper decision at New York's famed Madison Square Garden.  The bout was so popular, swarms of onlookers waiting to get in broke through the windows to gain entry.  Wells employed a cool, well calculated defense which baffled Brown throughout the bout. Brown could not defend against Wells's left jab which played about his face at great speed, helping Wells to take as many as seven rounds.  The match was one of the first legal boxing matches in New York that allowed the purchase of tickets rather than a membership in a club, and the Garden was packed with fans. A near riot occurred as those who were turned away rushed into the auditorium to try to purchase additional tickets to obtain seating.  Ten thousand were inside the Garden, with an additional five thousand outside hoping to obtain seats.  Wells used his right almost at will throughout the bout, and dodged the blows of Brown by shifting his body or back stepping with exceptional speed.  Brown used an effective left and got in some strong blows to Wells's face, but they rarely fazed Wells, nor slowed his attack. He wisely crowded Brown in the tenth to avoid a long range haymaker that might cause a knockout. 

On 26 April 1912 he lost to the exceptional American boxer Packey McFarland at Madison Square Garden, in Manhattan, New York City.  The Boston Globe considered McFarland the better boxer in each of the ten rounds, scoring with frequent right uppercuts to the face and body. As he repeatedly but cautiously found openings to use his right, McFarland allowed Wells to remain the aggressor with head down through much of the fight.  In major competition, McFarland was nearly undefeated, yet never managed to win a title.

Wells impressively defeated reigning World Featherweight Champion Abe Attell on 20 September 1911 in New York. Attell was nearing the end of his ten-year reign as champion and his bout with Wells was not made a title fight partly because he was outweighed by Wells. The Pittsburgh Press wrote the fight was "the greatest exhibition of scientific boxing that has been seen here in years. The Press went on to note that "although Attell was clearly outpointed, his defeat was not a disgrace or anything like it for Wells was heavier, stronger, taller, and had a longer reach."

Wells defeated British boxer and former claimant of the 1907 British sanctioned World Bantamweight championship Owen Moran on 27 September 1913 in Sydney Stadium in Australia. Moran was a former contender for the World Featherweight championship against Abe Attell on New Years Day 1908 in Colma, California, but failed to knockout Attell in 25 rounds.

Wells defeated American Ray Bronson, former holder of the World Welterweight Championship, in a seventh round technical knockout in Sydney, Australia on 28 February 1914.  Wells "inflicted severe punishment on the American" and his seconds threw in the towel at the end of the seventh round.  Bronson, who considered retiring after the loss, would not fight again for a decade, and then retire.

1914 title wins
On 21 March 1914 he won the Welterweight Championship of Britain and Welterweight Championship of the World by defeating Tom McCormick in a 20-round points decision at Sydney Stadium in New South Wales, Australia. On 1 June 1915, he lost the welterweight title to Mike Glover in a twelve-round decision at the arena in Boston, Massachusetts. The Boston Globe noted that Wells lacked the power he usually showed in his punch but was ready to mix with Glover, who had he been fighting less cautiously may have scored a knockout.   Wells competed for the British title again unsuccessfully against Johnny Basham on 13 November 1919 in Holborn Stadium in London.

Wells lost decisively to future World Feather and Junior Lightweight champion Johnny Dundee in a twelve round points decision in Boston on 16 May 1916.  In the one sided affair, Dundee jabbed and hooked Wells to the face and body throughout the bout. Dundee showed great blocking during the infighting where he also scored frequently and used fast footwork to elude punches.  Wells had previously lost to Dundee in a twelve round points decision before 3,500 fans on 10 December 1915 in New Haven that featured skilled blocking and countering throughout, but in which Dundee, the aggressor, always seemed to have the advantage.

Wells succumbed to his only knockout on 11 July 1916, from the talented Chicago lightweight Charley White.  In the fifth round, Wells' manager Danny Morgan stepped in to stop the fight.  Wells was dazed by a left to the chest in the third round, though he fought on.  At the end of the fourth, White caught Wells with a right hook as he rushed forward, putting him on the canvas for a count of five. He was down again for a count of eight from a left to the jaw. On the opening of the fifth, White went after Wells holding him with his right and battering him with his left.  Wells's manager ended the bout a minute into the round.

1919 title fight
Wells lost to Johnny Basham for the BBofC Welterweight Championship and the Commonwealth Welterweight Championship in a twenty round points decision in Holborn, England on 13 November 1919.  The bloody affair involved too much clinching by Basham, and a too frequent use of head butts by Wells.  By the eleventh, Wells, the older boxer by four years, was beginning to show signs of fatigue, but he never failed to mix when required.  With a clear advantage, Basham excelled in long range fighting, having a reach advantage of several inches, but he seemed to have the better of the infighting as well.  The eighteenth through twentieth rounds were all Basham's, who added to an already significant advantage in points, and though Wells took a beating and his face was bloody by the later rounds, he remained on his feet throughout the match.   Wells had formerly lost to Basham in a fifteen round points decision at the London Opera House on 22 March 1915.  Welsh had gained a bit of weight prior to the match which may have affected his speed, and Basham had continued to improve his skills in the previous year. 

On 26 December 1919, Wells lost to the accomplished English boxer Ted "Kid" Lewis in twelve of twenty rounds at Royal Albert Hall in Kensington. Lewis and Charley White became the only two boxers in Welles's career to stop him before the end of a fight. Taking a serious beating, Wells's face was cut badly and his nose was broken, before he gave up the unequal struggle in the twelfth.  

He was inducted into the International Jewish Sports Hall of Fame in 2007.

Professional boxing record
All information in this section is derived from BoxRec, unless otherwise stated.

Official record

All newspaper decisions are officially regarded as “no decision” bouts and are not counted in the win/loss/draw column.

Unofficial record

Record with the inclusion of newspaper decisions in the win/loss/draw column.

See also 
 Lineal championship
 List of welterweight boxing champions
 List of British welterweight boxing champions
 List of British lightweight boxing champions

External links 
 
 Jewish Sports Hall of Fame

Major titles

|-

|-

|-

References

1886 births
1953 deaths
English Jews
Jewish boxers
Boxers at the 1908 Summer Olympics
Olympic boxers of Great Britain
People from Walworth
Welterweight boxers
World welterweight boxing champions
World boxing champions
European Boxing Union champions
English male boxers
Jewish British sportspeople
Boxers from Greater London